Woman Trap may refer to:

 Woman Trap (1929 film), directed by William A. Wellman
 Woman Trap (1936 film), directed by Harold Young
 La Femme Piège or The Woman Trap, a 1986 science fiction graphic novel